Chen Jiahui (born 26 May 1995) is a Chinese former professional tennis player.

Career
On 26 September 2016, Chen achieved a career-high singles ranking of world No. 628. On 12 August 2019, she peaked at No. 353 in the WTA doubles rankings. She won four doubles titles on tournaments of the ITF Circuit in her career.

Chen made her WTA Tour main-draw debut at the 2019 Shenzhen Open in the doubles tournament, partnering Wang Danni.

ITF Circuit finals

Doubles: 10 (4 titles, 6 runner-ups)

References

External links
 
 

1995 births
Living people
Chinese female tennis players
21st-century Chinese women